Novomykolaivka may refer to several places in Ukraine:

Dnipropetrovsk Oblast
 Novomykolaivka, Dnipropetrovsk Oblast

Donetsk Oblast
 Novomykolaivka, Cherkaske settlement hromada, Kramatorsk Raion, Donetsk Oblast
 Novomykolaivka, Druzhkivka urban hromada, Kramatorsk Raion, Donetsk Oblast
 Novomykolaivka, Pokrovsk Raion, Donetsk Oblast
 Novomykolaivka, Shakhtarsk Raion, Donetsk Oblast
 Novomykolaivka, Volnovakha Raion, Donetsk Oblast

Zaporizhzhia Oblast
 Novomykolaivka, Zaporizhzhia Oblast